A ectopic testis is a testicle that, although not an undescended testicle, has taken a non-standard path through the body and ended up in an unusual location.

The positions of the ectopic testis may be: in the lower part of the abdomen, front of thigh, femoral canal, skin of penis or behind the scrotum. The testis is usually developed, and accompanied by an indirect inguinal hernia. It may be divorced from the epididymis which may lie in the scrotum.

See also 
 Cryptorchidism
 Orchiopexy

References

External links 

Andrology
Testicle disorders
Men's health